The 2006 Nebraska Cornhuskers football team represented the University of Nebraska–Lincoln in the 2006 NCAA Division I FBS football season. The team was coached by Bill Callahan and played their home games at Memorial Stadium in Lincoln, Nebraska.

Before the season
While the Huskers lost talented running back Cory Ross and defensive back Daniel Bullocks, they did retain offensive lynchpin Zac Taylor (QB) and talented kicker Jordon Congdon. The team also hoped to play I-back Marlon Lucky (who excelled on kick returns as a freshman) as their starting running back. Terrence Nunn, the top kick-returner in the Big 12 last season, also returned and was intended to be the Huskers' featured receiver.

On defense, the Blackshirts include DE Adam Carriker, among others. The Ruud name returned to Lincoln, with Bo Ruud playing weakside linebacker.

Schedule

Rankings

Roster and coaching staff

Depth chart

Game summaries

Louisiana Tech

Nicholls State

USC

Troy

Kansas

Iowa State

Kansas State

Nebraska won their 800th football game with a win over Kansas State on October 14, 2006.  Only four teams have won 800 or more games: Michigan, Notre Dame, Texas, and now Nebraska.

Texas

The Cornhuskers entered the game against the 2006 Texas Longhorn football team ranked 16th in both human polls and 19th in the computer rankings, for a total BCS ranking of 17th. Coming into the game, Texas was the third-winningest program in college football, with 800 wins. Nebraska was fourth, having won their 800th game the previous weekend vs Kansas State.  Only four teams have won 800 or more games: Michigan, Notre Dame, Texas, and now Nebraska.  The game marked the first time for Texas to face an 800-win program since Texas broke through the 800-win barrier. The 2006 football season also marked the first time for four 800-win programs to face off against each other, with Notre Dame and Michigan having played each other earlier in the season.

In terms of winning percentage, Texas ranked third at 71.52% while Nebraska ranked seventh at 70.57%.  The Cornhuskers claimed five national championships on top of Texas' four. The environment at Lincoln has been considered one of the most hostile for an opposing team, due in part to the noise of the crowd.

Austin American-Statesman columnist Kirk Bohls predicted that Nebraska might pull off an upset against the Longhorns.  Among the reasons he gave were that "Texas isn't a great running team (only a good one).." that "Texas' pass defense is very suspect..." and that Longhorn kicker Greg Johnson had only kicked one field goal all year.  Bohls also speculated that Nebraska might have more motivation because "Texas has had Nebraska's number for a while, ... [Texas] knocked off the Huskers in the inaugural Big 12 football championship game at St. Louis to deprive Nebraska of a shot at another national title in 1996." In 1998, freshman quarterback Major Applewhite led the Longhorns to a victory over the seventh-ranked Cornhuskers, snapping their 47-home game winning streak. They also ended the Cornhuskers new streak at 26 in 2002.  Coming into the 2006 game, Texas was the only team in the Big Twelve Conference with a winning record vs. Nebraska, with a 6–4 lead.  Texas leads the series 5–1 since the formation of the Big 12, and they are 4–1 against Nebraska since Mack Brown came to Texas.

Prior to the game, the betting line in Las Vegas casinos was Texas by 5 ½ points.  The game set a new stadium attendance record crowd of 85,187, the 280th consecutive sell-out at Nebraska. The game featured 36-degree temperatures, winds out of the north at 20 miles per hour, rain, and snow flurries.

Texas got the ball to start the game and Quan Cosby returned the kick-off to within the Nebraska 10 yard line. The Longhorns were unable to score a touchdown and had to settle for a field goal.  Nebraska scored a first-quarter touchdown. Texas scored 14 points in the second quarter, but kicker Greg Johnson had one of the two extra points blocked, so the score at half-time had Texas ahead 16 to 7.  Johnson also missed two field goals during the game.  Neither team scored in the third quarter.

In the fourth quarter, Nebraska took a 20–19 lead with 4 minutes 54 seconds left in the game.  After Texas was forced to punt, Nebraska only had to run out the clock to ensure victory.  Nebraska ran a passing play on third down and NU receiver Terrence Nunn picked up the first down but fumbled the ball.  The fumble was recovered by Texas safety Marcus Griffin at the Nebraska 44 yard-line with 2:17 left.  Colt McCoy led the Longhorns through the snow flurries to the Nebraska 5.  With less than a minute remaining, and the Horns facing fourth down, Texas needed a field goal to win.

Johnson had already missed three kicks (two field goals and an extra point) and he told Coach Brown late in the game that his leg was tightening up.  Brown looked to walk-on sophomore Ryan Bailey to give the Longhorns the win.  Bailey had made only 10 kicks as a high-school kicker from Anderson High School in Austin, Texas and he had never attempted a kick for the Longhorns.  The trip at Nebraska was only the second time he had ever been included in the travel roster, which is limited to 64 players.  Before the kick, Brown told him "You're the luckiest guy in the world. You've got a chance to be Dusty Mangum on your first kick."  Mangum had scored the game-winning field goal as time expired to lift the Longhorns to victory over the Michigan Wolverines in the 2005 Rose Bowl.

Before Bailey could attempt the kick, Nebraska's coach attempted to "ice the kicker" by using his coach's challenge to have the officials review the preceding third-down play. The play was reviewed and allowed to stand as an incomplete pass, as called on the field. Brown gave Bailey a swat on the helmet and Bailey jogged onto the field and calmly made the kick.  Nebraska had time for two shots at the end-zone but both passes were broken up, and Texas won the game by 2 points, 22–20.

The win was Texas' 16th straight road game victory, extending a school record, and 19th consecutive win in conference play.  The latter streak is the second longest in the country, following the conference game winning steak of USC. The game was the first time for Colt McCoy to lead the Longhorns to a come-from-behind victory in the fourth quarter.

The Longhorns had several injuries during the game.  Defensive starters Derek Lokey and Robert Killebrew both had to leave the game due to leg injuries.  Cornerback Tarell Brown was seen limping badly after the game and kicker-punter Greg Johnson aggravated a previous injury on his fourth-quarter field goal.

Former Longhorn quarterback Vince Young was on the sidelines for the first time since going to the NFL and he went to the Longhorn locker room afterwards to congratulate the team on the win.  Representatives from the Fiesta Bowl, the game that normally takes the Big 12 Conference champion, were also on hand.

There had been media speculation that Nebraska and Texas would win their respective conference divisions to play again in the Big 12 Conference Championship. This possibility was echoed in post-game interviews as both teams voiced respect for the other.  Texas coach Mack Brown said, "Nebraska is back, For them to keep coming back and back and back – they made big plays throughout the game to put themselves in a position to win." He continued, "As soon as they back away from it, they'll see that their program is back on track, one of the best in the country. And they'll be excited about a chance to go play somebody in (the Big 12 championship game). Hopefully, if we can keep playing, it might be us."  Nebraska cornerback Cortney Grixby said of Texas, "They kept their composure.  That's the mark of a champion.  And that's what they are."

Oklahoma State

Missouri

Texas A&M

Colorado

Oklahoma

Called "The Battle of the Big Reds", the rivalry between the University of Oklahoma and Nebraska University was one of the most heated contests of the old Big Eight Conference.  Played every Thanksgiving weekend for 71 years (from 1927 to 1998), this contest produced many memorable games; including the Game of the Century in 1971. The rivalry has cooled somewhat since the creation of the Big 12 as Bill Callahan's Nebraska Cornhuskers and Stoops's Oklahoma Sooners now split a home-and-home two of every four years.

This is only the fourth time that the teams have met at a neutral site.  The last time was the 1979 Orange Bowl where the Sooners won 31–24. Oklahoma holds the lead in the all-time series 42 to 37 with 3 ties and has never lost to Nebraska on neutral turf (one 7–7 tie in 1919 in Omaha).  Bob Stoops is 3–1 against Nebraska and  has a two-game winning streak; Callahan has never beaten Oklahoma.

This is the first time the two teams have met in the Big 12 Championship Game to determine the Big 12 Conference champion. Nebraska played in the championship game three of the first four years, winning in 1997 and '99, but had not made it back since. Oklahoma missed the first four games but represented the south four of the next six years, topping the conference in 2000, '02, and '04. Oklahoma has both the most appearances in the championship game (5) and conference titles (3) of any team in the Big 12.

Nebraska received the ball to start the game but Maurice Purify fumbled on the first play from scrimmage.  Oklahoma recovered the ball at the Nebraska 2 and scored a touchdown to take the lead 7–0 with 48 seconds expired off the clock.  It was the fastest score in Big 12 Championship Game history. With 5:35 left in the first quarter, Oklahoma executed a touchdown pass to Malcolm Kelly to go up 14–0.

With 4:37 left in the first half, Nebraska's Zac Taylor threw a touchdown pass and the extra point shaved Oklahoma's lead to 14–7, which was still the score as the game went to half-time.

At the start of the half, Oklahoma started with the ball but were unable to advance, as Nebraska recorded their first quarterback sack of the game and caused Oklahoma to go three-and-out and punt.  Later in the third quarter, Oklahoma used 11 plays, 3 minutes and 21 seconds, to go 99 yards and score a touchdown with 1:25 left in the third quarter.

With 8:53 left in the game, Nebraska threw what was almost a touchdown pass, but Nick Harris made a diving catch to intercept the ball in the end-zone for a touchback.  Neither team scored in the fourth quarter, so Oklahoma won the game 21–7.  It was their fourth Big 12 Conference football championship, which is the most for any team in the conference (Nebraska and Texas each have two).

Auburn (Cotton Bowl Classic)

If Nebraska had won the Big 12 Conference Championship Game, they would have gone to the Fiesta Bowl.  Since they lost, they went to the Cotton Bowl Classic; the Big 12 Conference announced before the Championship Game that the loser would receive a Cotton Bowl Classic invitation.  The Cotton Bowl Classic was played on New Year's Day.

After the season
After the acrimonious firing of Frank Solich in 2003 for what Nebraska Athletic Director Steve Pederson perceived as a failure to recruit top players, Nebraska hired Callahan, who promptly introduced the West Coast offense, a marked shift from Nebraska's traditional I-formation option attack. The offense took time to register with the players as the Huskers struggled to adapt, posting a 5–6 season in 2004, Nebraska's first losing season in over 40 years. However, in 2005 the Huskers started fast, going 4–0 to start the season before being defeated at home by Texas Tech 34–31. After a rebound win over a weak Baylor squad, the next few games were some that Huskers fans would want to forget: a 41–24 loss away to Missouri, a home loss to Oklahoma, and a crushing road defeat at Kansas, which had not defeated Nebraska since 1968. However, the season ended on a higher note, as the Huskers dominated the Colorado 30–3 in Boulder.

Awards

NFL and pro players
The following Nebraska players who participated in the 2006 season later moved on to the next level and joined a professional or semi-pro team as draftees or free agents.

References

Nebraska
Nebraska Cornhuskers football seasons
Nebraska Cornhuskers football